In Euclidean geometry, rectification, also known as critical truncation or complete-truncation, is the process of truncating a polytope by marking the midpoints of all its edges, and cutting off its vertices at those points. The resulting polytope will be bounded by vertex figure facets and the rectified facets of the original polytope. 

A rectification operator is sometimes denoted by the letter  with a Schläfli symbol.

Conway polyhedron notation uses  for ambo as this operator. In graph theory this operation creates a medial graph.

The rectification of any regular self-dual polyhedron or tiling will result in another regular polyhedron or tiling with a tiling order of 4, for example the tetrahedron  becoming an octahedron  As a special case, a square tiling  will turn into another square tiling  under a rectification operation.

Example of rectification as a final truncation to an edge 
Rectification is the final point of a truncation process. For example, on a cube this sequence shows four steps of a continuum of truncations between the regular and rectified form:

Higher degree rectifications 
Higher degree rectification can be performed on higher-dimensional regular polytopes. The highest degree of rectification creates the dual polytope. A rectification truncates edges to points. A birectification truncates faces to points. A trirectification truncates cells to points, and so on.

Example of birectification as a final truncation to a face 
This sequence shows a birectified cube as the final sequence from a cube to the dual where the original faces are truncated down to a single point:

In polygons 

The dual of a polygon is the same as its rectified form. New vertices are placed at the center of the edges of the original polygon.

In polyhedra and plane tilings 

Each platonic solid and its dual have the same rectified polyhedron. (This is not true of polytopes in higher dimensions.)

The rectified polyhedron turns out to be expressible as the intersection of the original platonic solid with an appropriated scaled concentric version of its dual.  For this reason, its name is a combination of the names of the original and the dual:

 The rectified tetrahedron, whose dual is the tetrahedron, is the tetratetrahedron, better known as the octahedron. 
 The rectified octahedron, whose dual is the cube, is the cuboctahedron.
 The rectified icosahedron, whose dual is the dodecahedron, is the icosidodecahedron.
 A rectified square tiling is a square tiling.
 A rectified triangular tiling or hexagonal tiling is a trihexagonal tiling.

Examples

In nonregular polyhedra 
If a polyhedron is not regular, the edge midpoints surrounding a vertex may not be coplanar. However, a form of rectification is still possible in this case: every polyhedron has a polyhedral graph as its 1-skeleton, and from that graph one may form the medial graph by placing a vertex at each edge midpoint of the original graph, and connecting two of these new vertices by an edge whenever they belong to consecutive edges along a common face. The resulting medial graph remains polyhedral, so by Steinitz's theorem it can be represented as a polyhedron.

The Conway polyhedron notation equivalent to rectification is ambo, represented by a. Applying twice aa, (rectifying a rectification) is Conway's expand operation, e, which is the same as Johnson's cantellation operation, t0,2 generated from regular polyhedral and tilings.

In 4-polytopes and 3D honeycomb tessellations 

Each Convex regular 4-polytope has a rectified form as a uniform 4-polytope.

A regular 4-polytope {p,q,r} has cells {p,q}. Its rectification will have two cell types, a rectified {p,q} polyhedron left from the original cells and {q,r} polyhedron as new cells formed by each truncated vertex.

A rectified {p,q,r} is not the same as a rectified {r,q,p}, however. A further truncation, called bitruncation, is symmetric between a 4-polytope and its dual. See Uniform 4-polytope#Geometric derivations.

Examples

Degrees of rectification 

A first rectification truncates edges down to points. If a polytope is regular, this form is represented by an extended Schläfli symbol notation t1{p,q,...} or r{p,q,...}.

A second rectification, or birectification, truncates faces down to points. If regular it has notation t2{p,q,...} or 2r{p,q,...}. For polyhedra, a birectification creates a dual polyhedron.

Higher degree rectifications can be constructed for higher dimensional polytopes. In general an n-rectification truncates n-faces to points.

If an n-polytope is (n-1)-rectified, its facets are reduced to points and the polytope becomes its dual.

Notations and facets 

There are different equivalent notations for each degree of rectification. These tables show the names by dimension and the two type of facets for each.

Regular polygons 

Facets are edges, represented as {2}.

Regular polyhedra and tilings 

Facets are regular polygons.

Regular Uniform 4-polytopes and honeycombs 
Facets are regular or rectified polyhedra.

Regular 5-polytopes and 4-space honeycombs 
Facets are regular or rectified 4-polytopes.

See also
 Dual polytope
 Quasiregular polyhedron
 List of regular polytopes
 Truncation (geometry)
 Conway polyhedron notation

References 

 Coxeter, H.S.M. Regular Polytopes, (3rd edition, 1973), Dover edition,  (pp. 145–154 Chapter 8: Truncation)
 Norman Johnson Uniform Polytopes, Manuscript (1991)
 N.W. Johnson: The Theory of Uniform Polytopes and Honeycombs, Ph.D. Dissertation, University of Toronto, 1966
 John H. Conway, Heidi Burgiel, Chaim Goodman-Strauss, The Symmetries of Things 2008,  (Chapter 26)

External links 
 

Polytopes